Castilla District is one of ten districts of the province Piura in Peru. The district was created in 1861 during the presidency of Ramón Castilla. In 2007, it had a population of 120,000.

References

1861 establishments in Peru